Ashena Courier Co (ACC) (Persian name: پیک آشنا ) was the first private postal service in Iran. ACC was established in early 2008 in Tehran as a local courier company with the objective of becoming the first private Iranian postal and international logistics service provider. That year, ACC secured contracts with various governmental and non-governmental organizations to handle the transfer of documents and parcels between those organizations. ACC received its license as a Special Courier Co. from I.R.I Post Company in mid-2008. Later, ACC was approved by the Ministry of Communications and Information Technology (MICT) and the Communications  Regulatory Authority (CRA). ACC Express provides courier services across Iran. ACC provides warehousing and cargo services at Payam Airport.

ACC Cargo Services 
ACC is an official agent for Payam Aviation Services Co. The company provides warehousing and cargo services at Payam Airport. ACC cargo services also provides consulting services that include: 
Import/export management
Customs clearance
Freight forwarding
Rate negotiation
Distribution network planning
Fleet management
Site selection for facility location
Freight consolidation and logistics audit.

See also
Courier
Freight company
Express mail
Mail
Cargo

References 

Logistics companies of Iran
Transport companies established in 2008
Postal system of Iran